Seo or SEO may refer to:

 Search engine optimization, the process of improving the visibility of a website or a web page in search engines

Organisations
 SEO Economic Research, a scientific institute
 Spanish Ornithological Society (Sociedad Española de Ornitología)

People
 Seo (surname), a Korean and Japanese family name
 SEO (artist), Seo Soo-kyoung (born 1977) Korean painter in Berlin

Places
 Séguéla Airport (IATA code), Ivory Coast
 Serving Every Ohioan Library Center in Caldwell, Ohio, United States
 Västra Götaland County (ISO 3166 code: SE-O), a county in Sweden
 Seo, Kohistan, an administrative unit in Khyber Pakhtunkhwa, Pakistan
 Seo (瀬尾村), a former village that was merged into Imaichi City, now itself also merged into Nikkō, Tochigi Prefecture, Japan

Other uses
 Can Seo, a television series
 Seasoned equity offering, a new equity issue by a company after its initial public offering
 Security Engineering Officer
 Senior Executive Officer, a grade within the United Kingdom's Civil Service
 Socio-Economic Objective, an Australian Standard Research Classification from the Australian Bureau of Statistics
 State electoral office

See also
 Seo-gu (disambiguation)